Sarafian or Sarafyan is an Armenian surname. It is patronymic from Arabic saraf, ‘money changer’, ‘banker’. Notable people with the surname include:

Ara Sarafian, British historian
Asatour Sarafian, known as Oscar H. Banker (1895–1979), Ottoman Empire-born Armenian-American inventor
Barbara Sarafian (born 1968), Belgian actress
Bruce Sarafian (born 1966), American juggler
Daniel Sarafian (born 1982), Brazilian-Armenian martial artist
Deran Sarafian (born 1961), American actor, film and television director
Katherine Sarafian (born 1970), American film producer at Pixar Animation Studios
Nigoghos Sarafian (1905–1973), Armenian writer
Richard C. Sarafian (1930–2013), American actor, film and television director
Sue Sarafian Jehl (1917–1997), American military personnel, one of the three personal secretaries to General Dwight Eisenhower during World War II
Tedi Sarafian, American screenwriter
Angela Sarafyan, Armenian-American actress

Armenian-language surnames
Surnames of Arabic origin